Andre-Henri "Ollie" le Roux (born 10 May 1973) is a South African rugby union footballer with 54 caps for his country.

Rugby career
Le Roux was born in Fort Beaufort, Eastern Cape. He has also played invitational rugby for the Barbarians.

Le Roux made his international debut for the Springboks against England in 1994 and won 54 Springbok caps. He holds the record as the youngest prop forward to ever play for South Africa.

He became a crowd favourite on joining Leinster. He was part of their Celtic League success in 2008. Despite Le Roux's large size – 6' (1.8m) and 136 kilograms (or 21 st 7 lbs/ 301 lbs) his work rate around the field is top drawer.

Test Match Record

Pld = Games Played, W = Games Won, D = Games Drawn, L = Games Lost, Tri = Tries Scored, Pts = Points Scored

Retirement
Now retired, the chicken farming entrepreneur recently completed an Ironman triathlon. He lives in Bloemfontein with his wife Mariska and their four daughters Mia, Chloe, Donna and Lisa. He currently is part of the Optimum Financial Services group

Honours

Springboks
 Tri Nations: 1998

Sharks
 Currie Cup: 1992

Free State Cheetahs
 Currie Cup: 2005, 2006 (shared), 2007 (Le Roux did not feature in final)

Leinster
 Celtic League: 2008

See also
List of South Africa national rugby union players – Springbok no. 600

References

External links

Leinster profile
Profile on ESPNscrum.com

1973 births
Living people
People from Raymond Mhlaba Local Municipality
Afrikaner people
Rugby union props
South African rugby union players
South Africa international rugby union players
Leinster Rugby players
Barbarian F.C. players
Cheetahs (rugby union) players
Free State Cheetahs players
Lions (United Rugby Championship) players
Sharks (Currie Cup) players
Sharks (rugby union) players
Rugby union players from the Eastern Cape